The South Carolina Shamrocks were an American soccer team that played in Spartanburg, South Carolina. The Shamrocks played the 1998 and 1999 seasons at Greer City Stadium, then called Shamrock Stadium.

Year-by-year

Coaches
 Leo Flanagan (1997)

Defunct soccer clubs in South Carolina
USL Second Division teams
1996 establishments in South Carolina
Association football clubs established in 1996
Association football clubs disestablished in 1999
1999 disestablishments in South Carolina
Soccer clubs in South Carolina